Seo Jeong-ju (May 18, 1915 – December 24, 2000) was a Korean poet and university professor who wrote under the pen name Midang ( "not yet fully grown"). He is widely considered one of the best poets in twentieth-century Korean literature and was nominated five times for the Nobel Prize in literature.

Life
Seo Jeong-ju was born in Gochang County, North Jeolla Province and received his primary education in Seodang village until 1924. The traditional stories told him by his grandmother, his primary education and his youthful experiences influenced his literary style. He went to Jung-Ang Buddhist College, but he dropped out of school in 1936 after being involved in a demonstration. In 1936, his poem, Byuk (Wall), was published in The Dong-a Ilbo newspaper. He became a pro-Japanese activist, and wrote various poems in praise of Japanese Imperialism in the late colonial period.

After the independence of Korea, he worked as a professor of literature at Dongguk University and others from 1959 to 1979. Since his wife's death in October 2000, he barely ate or drank anything besides beer and died on December 24, 2000.

Works
Seo Jeong-ju's early works were modernistic and also surrealistic, influenced mostly by foreign literature. His first collection of poems, Wha-Sa Jip (Flower snake), was published in 1941. The book explores humanity's feelings of guilt and folklore. His poem Jahwasang (Portrait) describes a young poet whose desire to learn was interrupted by Imperial Japan in 1910. However, Midang wrote Japanophilic literature for the newspaper Mail Ilbo from 1942 to 1944 under the Japanese penname, .

The publication of Village of Poets (Siin burak), a literary coterie journal that Seo founded along with Kim Tong-ni and Ham Hyeongsu, marks the beginning of his literary career. After the Liberation, Seo was actively involved in the formation of the Association of Joseon Literary Youth (Joseon cheongnyeon munhakga hyeophoe) and in 1949 he became one of the key founding members of the Association of Korean Writers (Hanguk munin hyeophoe). He was nominated as a lifetime member of the Arts Center (Yesulwon) in 1954. He also gave frequent lectures in poetry at Dongguk University.

Seo's influence on Korean poetry stems in part from the poems in The Early Lyrics 1941-1960. Baudelaire's influence is unmistakable in his early poetry. Primeval and even demonic in tone, Seo's first volume of poetry Hwasajip explores men's awareness of original sin and the primeval life force against the backdrop of local or indigenous colors. After the liberation, however, the concept of original sin and predestination that marked his early poetry was replaced by the quest for never-ending life found in eastern philosophy. Gwichokdo, for example, suggests the poet's return to Buddhist ways of thought and classical style. Seo Jeongju Poems (1956), contains work that sings of a certain reconciliation between nature and han, a deep-seated sense of grief, as well as the poems "Crane" (Hak) and "A Prayer" (Gido) that show the poet's artistic maturity and his capacity for self-perception.

With Sillacho, Seo reached a new artistic height. The ancient country of Silla has long been the wellspring of the poet's artistic inspiration and transcendental vision, a country more akin to an imaginary homeland where nature and men exist in perfect unity, than a historical entity. Rooted in Buddhist thought, it revives the concept of karma and the philosophy of Zen Buddhism. Dongcheon, a collection of poems published in 1969, also reveals Seo's interest in Buddhist symbolism.

Legacy
According to translator Brother Anthony, Seo Jeong-ju was the founding father of modern Korean poetry, and his works have been translated into a number of languages, including English, French, Spanish, and German. In 2007, he was listed by the Korean Poets' Association among the ten most important modern Korean poets. His 100th anniversary in December 2016 was scheduled to be commemorated by the republication of his collected works which will now include recently discovered and previously unpublished poems. The Midang Literary House was opened in the year after his death, sited in poet's native village and final resting place. The Midang Literary Prize is presented there during the chrysanthemum season, in commemoration of his most famous poem, "Beside the Chrysanthemum" (국화옆에서): 

The chrysanthemum blooms in late autumn and is associated with the first frosts, the point at which the poem comes to rest. First published in 1948, it was set by the Korean composer Hwang Byungki in 1962.

Works in translation
"Unforgettable Things" (안 잊혀지는 일들)
Early Lyrics 1941-1960, The Poems by SO Chong-Ju (Midang)  (bilingual) Translated and Introduced by Brother Anthony of Taizé, 1998, (Translations in this book are viewable at http://www.sogang.ac.kr/~anthony/Sojngju.htm.)
Poems of a Wanderer by Midang So Chong-Ju, Chongju So, Kevin O'Rourke (Translator), Chong-Ju So, 1995
The Early Lyrics of So Chong Ju by Midang, Anthony of Taize (Translator), 1993

Works in Korea (partial)
Complete Literary Works of Seo Jeongju (Seo Jeongju munhakjeonjip) in five volumes was published by Iljisa in 1972
Complete Poems of Midang (Midang si jeonjip) was published by Mineumsa in 1994

See also
 Korean poetry
 Korean literature
 List of Korean-language poets
 Poet Midang Memorial Hall
 Midang Literary Award

References

External links
 Poet Midang Memorial Hall website 
Facebook Page Image Gallery, Poetry, and Popular Contemporary Mentions
http://www.gochang.go.kr/english/index.gochang?menuCd=DOM_000001106008000000

South Korean male poets
Korean collaborators with Imperial Japan
Dongguk University alumni
People from Gochang County
1915 births
2000 deaths
20th-century South Korean poets
Academic staff of Dongguk University
South Korean Buddhists